"Let's Go" is a song by Canadian singer Shawn Desman. It was released in 2005 as the second single from his album Back for More. The song heavily features a synthesizer phrase sampled from the 1982 hit "Don't Go" by British new wave duo Yazoo.

The song peaked at number 6 on the Canadian Singles Chart, another top 10 hit for Desman. The song's music video also gained heavy airplay on VH1.

Music video
The music video features Desman dancing with back-up dancers in a room. The song also features some segments featuring Desman with a mixing board.

Track listing
"Let's Go" (Original Mix) - 3:59 
"Let's Go" (Uomo 98 Remix) - 3:53 
"Let's Go" (Uomo 108 Remix) - 6:00
"Let's Go" (video)

Chart performance

References

2005 songs
2005 singles
Shawn Desman songs
Sony BMG singles
Songs written by Vince Clarke